Damru is a 2018 Indian Bhojpuri-language action drama film directed by Rajnish Mishra and produced by Pradeep K Sharma under banner of "Baba Motion Pictures Pvt Ltd". It stars Khesari Lal Yadav and Yashika Kapoor, while Awadhesh Mishra, Padam Singh, Anand Mohan, Rohit Singh "Matru", Subodh Seth, Devendra Singh and Kiran Yadav play supporting roles. Director of this film Rajnish Mishra and lyricist Pawan Pandey make a special appearance in song "Tohra Karam Se Maula".

Cast
Khesari Lal Yadav as Bhola
Yashika Kapoor as Gauri
Awadhesh Mishra as Shankar/Lord Shiv
Padam Singh as Padam Pratap Singh
Dev Singh as Vidhayak
Anand Mohan as Pandit
 Rohit Singh "Matru"
 Subodh Seth
Kiran Yadav as Bhola's mother
Rajnish Mishra as special appearance in the song "Tohre Karam Se Maula"
Pawan Pandey as special appearance in the song "Tohre Karam Se Maula"

Production
Filming of Damru was done mostly in the village of Chaubepur in Varanasi district, Uttar Pradesh, with some scenes shot in China Creak and Vrindavan Studio (Malad) in Mumbai.

The script of "Damru" has been written and music was composed by Rajnish Mishra while cinematography is by Surya Mishra. Kanu Mukharjee have choreographed the dance numbers. Heera Lal Yadav has directed the action and stunts in the film. Art direction done by Mahesh Shirke. Sound design and effect done by Kailash Singh while background music scored by Chandrashekhar. Komal Verma is editor and trailer and promos edited by Umesh Mishra. VFX done by Amar Das (AD Studio). Costume and publicity designer are Neetu and Narsu Bahera (Shakti Art) respectively.

Release
The film was originally scheduled to release on 6 April 2018 but film has been postponed. The film was release in theatres on 13 April 2018. Technical issues have been cited for the delay.

Soundtrack

The soundtrack for "Damru" was composed by Rajnish Mishra with lyrics written by Pyare Lal Yadav, Ashok Kumar Deep, Shyam Dehati and Swati Sharma. The soundtrack included eight songs. It was produced under "Venus Bhojpuri" Label.

His song "Tar Tar Pasina" released on 16 June 2018 on YouTube official channel of "Venus Bhojpuri" and gots 118 million views.

Marketing
First and second look poster of this film was released on 23 January 2018 and teaser released on 30 January 2018 on YouTube.

The trailer of "Damru" was released on 19 February 2018 at YouTube official channel of "Venus Bhojpuri".

The film online streams at the Online video platform site YouTube at official channel of "Venus Bhojpuri" and its garnered 30 million views.

References

2018 films
2010s Bhojpuri-language films